Andrés Simón Gómez (born September 15, 1961) is a former sprinter from Cuba who won an Olympic bronze medal in 4 x 100 metres relay in 1992 Barcelona. He also participated in the relay at the 1996 Olympics in Atlanta. He specialized in the 60 meters and 100 metres events. His personal best for the 100m is 10.06, set in Havana 1987. He won the gold medal in the 60 m competition at the 1989 IAAF World Indoor Championships in Budapest.

References

External links
 
 

Cuban male sprinters
1961 births
Living people
Sportspeople from Guantánamo
Olympic athletes of Cuba
Olympic bronze medalists for Cuba
Athletes (track and field) at the 1992 Summer Olympics
Athletes (track and field) at the 1996 Summer Olympics
Medalists at the 1992 Summer Olympics
Olympic bronze medalists in athletics (track and field)
World Athletics Indoor Championships winners
Pan American Games medalists in athletics (track and field)
Pan American Games silver medalists for Cuba
Universiade medalists in athletics (track and field)
Central American and Caribbean Games gold medalists for Cuba
Competitors at the 1986 Central American and Caribbean Games
Athletes (track and field) at the 1987 Pan American Games
Athletes (track and field) at the 1991 Pan American Games
Goodwill Games medalists in athletics
Universiade gold medalists for Cuba
USA Indoor Track and Field Championships winners
Central American and Caribbean Games medalists in athletics
Medalists at the 1985 Summer Universiade
Competitors at the 1990 Goodwill Games
Competitors at the 1994 Goodwill Games
Medalists at the 1987 Pan American Games
20th-century Cuban people